Charles Amon Mihayo is a Tanzanian man, permanently residing in Australia, who killed his two daughters in Melbourne on 20 April 2014.

Background
Mihayo was born in Tanzania.

He met a woman in China, moved to Australia, and married her. He became a permanent resident of Australia. The two separated in 2011 with divorce occurring a year later.

The murders were committed in Melbourne's north-eastern suburb of Watsonia, at a property on Longmuir Road just near the Greensborough Secondary College. The house in which the girls were murdered belonged to the girls' maternal great-grandmother, Margaret Mills.

Crime
On 19 April 2014, Mihayo sent a text message asking his wife to allow him to see his daughters "one last time." On the following day, which was Easter Sunday, Mihayo bought new clothes for the girls and visited them at the residence of their great-grandmother in Watsonia, Melbourne, Victoria.

He asked his daughters, Savanna and Indianna to wear ballerina dresses and sing "Let It Go" from the 2013 American film Frozen. This was recorded on videotape. He also went to play hide and seek with them. He took them into a bedroom, smothered them with a pillow, and put them back into clothes after bathing them post-mortem. Mihayo confessed to killing the children when police came to arrest him.

Gavin Silbert QC, the chief crown prosecutor, stated that Mihayo was upset since his ex-wife found a new romantic partner. Mihayo pleaded guilty in September 2014. He received a life sentence with a minimum tariff of 31 years.

See also 
Cases of filicide attributed to revenge against an ex-spouse:
 John Battaglia
 Elaine Campione
 Amy Hebert
 Murder of the Kumari-Baker sisters
 Aaron Schaffhausen

References

2014 murders in Australia
Filicides in Australia
Incidents of violence against girls
Living people
Murder in Melbourne
Murderers of children
People convicted of murder by Victoria (Australia)
Prisoners sentenced to life imprisonment by Victoria (Australia)
Tanzanian people convicted of murder
Tanzanian people imprisoned abroad
Tanzanian prisoners sentenced to life imprisonment
Year of birth missing (living people)